Brent Williams may refer to:

Brent Williams (American football) (born 1964), NFL footballer of the 1980s and 1990s
Brent Williams (Australian footballer) (born 1978), Australian rules footballer for Adelaide
Buzz Williams (born 1972), American basketball coach